Agoristenidae are a neotropical harvestman family of the Suborder Laniatores, in the superfamily Gonyleptoidea.

Name
The name of the type genus is a combination of Ancient Greek agora "gathering" and stenos "few", referring to the rarity of the family at the time of its discovery.

Description
These harvestmen range in body length from two to about five millimeters. Their coloring ranges from yellowish to dark brown. Some show yellow stripes or white or green patches.

Distribution
The subfamily Agoristeninae is endemic to the Greater Antilles. The other subfamilies have been found from northern South America.

Relationships
Zamorinae are the basal clade, with Agoristeninae and Leiosteninae as sister groups. Agoristeninae is sister group to all Gonyleptoidea except Stygnopsidae.

(after Kury 1997b, 1997c)

Species

Agoristeninae

 Agoristenus Silhavy, 1973
 Agoristenus cubanus Silhavy, 1973 — Cuba
 Agoristenus haitensis Silhavy, 1973 — Haiti
 Ahotta Silhavy, 1973
 Ahotta hispaniolica Silhavy, 1973 — Hispaniola
 Calmotrinus Silhavy, 1973
 Calmotrinus turquinensis Silhavy, 1973 — Cuba
 Dumitrescuella Avram, 1977
 Dumitrescuella ornata Avram, 1977 — Cuba
 Haitimera Silhavy, 1973
 Haitimera paeninsularis Silhavy, 1973 — Hispaniola
 Lichirtes Silhavy, 1973
 Lichirtes hexapodoides Silhavy, 1973 — Cuba
 Meriosfera Silhavy, 1973
 Meriosfera gertschi Silhavy, 1973 — Hispaniola
 Meriosfera lineata Silhavy, 1973 — Hispaniola
 Orghidaniella Avram, 1977
 Orghidaniella granpiedrae Avram, 1977 — Cuba
 Piratrinus Silhavy, 1973
 Piratrinus calcaratus Silhavy, 1973 — Cuba
 Torreana Avram, 1977
 Torreana poeyi Avram, 1977 — Cuba
 Torreana spinata Avram, 1977 — Cuba
 Vampyrostenus Silhavy, 1976
 Vampyrostenus kratochvili Silhavy, 1976 — Puerto Rico
 Yunquenus Silhavy, 1973
 Yunquenus portoricanus Silhavy, 1973 — Puerto Rico

Leiosteninae

 Andrescava Roewer, 1957
 Andrescava sturmi Roewer, 1963 — Colombia
 Andrescava weyrauchi Roewer, 1957 — Peru
 Barinas M. A. González-Sponga, 1987
 Barinas flava M. A. González-Sponga, 1987 — Venezuela
 Barlovento M. A. González-Sponga, 1987
 Barlovento albapatella M. A. González-Sponga, 1987 — Venezuela
 Barlovento littorei M. A. González-Sponga, 1987 — Venezuela
 Barlovento marmorata (M. A. González-Sponga, 1981)
 Barlovento salmeronensis M. A. González-Sponga, 1987 — Venezuela
 Leptostygnus Mello-Leitão, 1940
 Leptostygnus leptochirus Mello-Leitão, 1940 — Colombia
 Leptostygnus marchantiarum (M. A. González-Sponga, 1987) — Venezuela
 Ocoita M. A. González-Sponga, 1987
 Ocoita mina M. A. González-Sponga, 1987 — Venezuela
 Ocoita servae M. A. González-Sponga, 1987 — Venezuela
 Ocoita tapipensis M. A. González-Sponga, 1987 — Venezuela
 Paravima Caporiacco, 1951
 Paravima flumencaurimarensis M. A. González-Sponga, 1987 — Venezuela
 Paravima goodnightiorum Caporiacco, 1951 — Venezuela
 Paravima locumida M. A. González-Sponga, 1987 — Venezuela
 Paravima morritomacairensis M. A. González-Sponga, 1987 — Venezuela
 Paravima propespelunca M. A. González-Sponga, 1987 — Venezuela
 Sabanilla Roewer, 1913
 Sabanilla ornata Roewer, 1913 — Colombia?, Venezuela
 Trinella Goodnight & Goodnight, 1947
 Trinella albidecorata (Silhavy, 1979) — Venezuela
 Trinella albimaculata (González-Sponga, 1998)
 Trinella albiornata (Goodnight & Goodnight, 1947) — Trinidad
 Trinella azulitai (M. Rambla, 1978) — Venezuela
 Trinella bicoloripes (Roewer, 1949) — Brazil
 Trinella bordoni (Muñoz-Cuevas, 1975)
 Trinella bubonica (M. A. González-Sponga, 1987) — Venezuela
 Trinella chapmani (M. Rambla, 1978) — Venezuela
 Trinella checkeleyi (M. Rambla, 1978) — Venezuela
 Trinella chiguaraensis (M. A. González-Sponga, 1987) — Venezuela
 Trinella falconensis (M. A. González-Sponga, 1987) — Venezuela
 Trinella flavomaculata (M. A. González-Sponga, 1987) — Venezuela
 Trinella glabrata (González-Sponga, 1998)
 Trinella granulata (González-Sponga, 1998)
 Trinella intermedia Goodnight & Goodnight, 1947 — Trinidad
 Trinella leiobuniformis (Silhavy, 1973) — Trinidad
 Trinella leucobunus (Roewer, 1949) — Suriname
 Trinella matintaperera Pinto-da-Rocha, 1996 — Brazil
 Trinella naranjoi (H. E. M. Soares & S. Avram, 1981) — Venezuela
 Trinella nigromaculata (González-Sponga, 1998)
 Trinella octomaculata (Roewer, 1963) — Peru
 Trinella olmosa (Roewer, 1956) — Peru
 Trinella palpogranulosa (M. A. González-Sponga, 1981) — Venezuela
 Trinella plana (Goodnight & Goodnight, 1949) — Venezuela
 Trinella quadrata (M. A. González-Sponga, 1987) — Venezuela
 Trinella quirozi (M. A. González-Sponga, 1981) — Venezuela
 Trinella scabra (Roewer, 1963) — Colombia
 Trinella severa H. E. M. Soares & S. Avram, 1981 — Venezuela
 Trinella soaresorum Rocha, 1996 — Brazil
 Trinella subparamera (M. A. González-Sponga, 1987) — Venezuela
 Trinella troglobia Rocha, 1996 — Venezuela
 Trinella venezuelica (H. E. M. Soares & S. Avram, 1981) — Venezuela
 Vima Hirst, 1912
 Vima insignis Hirst, 1912 —Guyana
 Vimina M. A. González-Sponga, 1987
 Vimina virginis M. A. González-Sponga, 1987 — Venezuela

Zamorinae

 Globibunus Roewer, 1912
 Globibunus rubrofemoratus Roewer, 1912 — Ecuador
 Palcabius Roewer, 1956
 Palcabius palpalis Roewer, 1956 — Peru
 Ramonus Roewer, 1956
 Ramonus conifrons Roewer, 1956 — Peru
 Zamora Roewer, 1927
 Zamora granulata Roewer, 1927 — Ecuador
 Zamora vulcana Kury, 1997 — Ecuador

References

  (1997b): A new subfamily of Agoristenidae, with comments on suprageneric relationships of the family (Arachnida, Opiliones, Laniatores). Trop. Zool. 10: 333-346.
  (1997c): Os Stygnopsidae na filogenia de Gonyleptoidea, com comentários sobre a biogeografia da superfamilia. P. 30 in Actas del Primer Encuentro de Aracnólogos del Cono Sur. Montevideo, Uruguay.
  (eds.) (2007): Harvestmen - The Biology of Opiliones. Harvard University Press 
  (2010) : New familial assignments for three species of Neotropical harvestmen based on cladistic analysis (Arachnida: Opiliones: Laniatores). Zootaxa, 2241: 33–46.

Harvestman families
Fauna of Hispaniola